The Church of Jesus Christ of Latter-day Saints in Kansas refers to the Church of Jesus Christ of Latter-day Saints (LDS Church) and its members in Kansas. The first congregation of the Church in Kansas was organized in 1895. It has since grown to 38,311 members in 75 congregations.

Official church membership as a percentage of general population was 1.25% in 2014. According to the 2014 Pew Forum on Religion & Public Life survey, roughly 1% of Kansans self-identify themselves most closely with The Church of Jesus Christ of Latter-day Saints. The LDS Church is the 10th largest denomination in Kansas.

History

In 1882, missionaries arrived in Kansas and organized the Meridian Branch.

By 1930, Church membership in Kansas was 2,060 and the first stake in Kansas was organized in June 1962.

The Kansas City Missouri Temple, dedicated in 2012, serves 45,000 LDS Church members from 126 congregations in Kansas and Missouri.

Stakes
As of February 2023, there were 7 stakes with stake centers in Kansas.

 *Stakes outside of state with congregations in Kansas

Missions
On February 22, 2013, the Kansas Wichita Mission was announced to be created largely from the Missouri Independence Mission.

Temples

See also

The Church of Jesus Christ of Latter-day Saints membership statistics (United States)
Religion in Kansas

References

External links
 Newsroom (Kansas)
 ComeUntoChrist.org Latter-day Saints Visitor site
 The Church of Jesus Christ of Latter-day Saints Official site

Christianity in Kansas
Latter Day Saint movement in Kansas
Kansas